Manu is an Indo-Bangladesh transboundary river that originates below the Kahosib Chura of the Shakhantang Mountains in the Indian state of Tripura, flowing north-east through Kumarghat and Kailasahar, and Passes through the Moulvibazar district of Bangladesh to the Sylhet Plain, later the Dholai River joins Manu and then it flows northwest and meets the Kushiara Manumukh. It is 167 km (104 m) long, making it the longest river in Tripura.  It is located near the town of Manu. The river has a width of 200 meters in the railway bridge area.  The area of the basin is 500 square kilometres.  The river flows throughout the year.

Legend 
Some believe that a Hindu Shastrakar, Manu, used to worship Shiva on the banks of this river, hence the name of this river is Manu.

See also
List of rivers in Bangladesh

References

External links
Kallu Kumhar Ki Unnakoti
Rivers of Tripura

Rivers of Bangladesh
Rivers of Tripura
Moulvibazar District
Rivers of India
Rivers of Sylhet Division

es:Río Manu